Shahabad Union is a union parishad of Narail Sadar Upazila, Narail District in Khulna Division of Bangladesh. It has an area of 48.69 km2 (18.80 sq mi) and a population of 12,572.

References

Khulna Division
Narail District